Huangjiang is a town under the jurisdiction of the prefecture-level city of Dongguan in Guangdong Province, China. It is located to the southeast of downtown Dongguan and borders Shenzhen's Bao'an and Guangming districts to the southwest and south, respectively.

Transportation

 
Huangjiang will host 5 Dongguan Rail Transit stations under the current plans for construction of Line 4:

 Huangjiangbei - Line 1
 Huangniupu - Line 1
 Huangjiang Center - Line 1 & Line 4
 Huangjiangdong - Line 4
 Huangjiangnan - Line 1

External links

Towns in Guangdong
Geography of Dongguan